{{Infobox election
| election_name = 2022 Georgia House of Representatives election
| country = Georgia (U.S. state)
| type = legislative
| ongoing = no
| previous_election = 2020 Georgia House of Representatives election
| previous_year = 2020
| next_election = 2024 Georgia House of Representatives election
| next_year = 2024
| seats_for_election = All 180 seats in the Georgia House of Representatives
| majority_seats = 91
| election_date = November 8, 2022
| turnout = 
| image1 = 
| leader1 = David Ralston (not seeking renomination)
| party1 = Republican Party (US)
| leader_since1 = January 11, 2010
| leaders_seat1 = 7th
| last_election1 = 103
| seats_before1 = 103
| seats1 = 101
| seat_change1 = 2
| popular_vote1 = '''| percentage1 = %| swing1 = %
| image2 = 
| leader2 = James Beverly
| party2 = Democratic Party (US)
| leader_since2 = January 11, 2021
| leaders_seat2 = 143rd
| last_election2 = 77
| seats_before2 = 77
| seats2 = 79
| seat_change2 = 2
| popular_vote2 = 
| percentage2 = %
| swing2 = %
| map_image = 2022 Georgia State House election.svg
| map_size = 400px
| map_caption = Results:  
| title = Speaker
| before_election = David Ralston
| before_party = Republican
| after_election = Jon G. Burns
| after_party = Republican
}}

The 2022 Georgia House of Representatives elections''' were held on November 8, 2022 as part of the biennial United States elections. Georgia voters elected state representatives in all 180 of the state house's districts to the 157th Georgia General Assembly. State representatives serve two-year terms in the Georgia House of Representatives.

Primaries were held on May 24, 2022, and primary runoffs occurred June 21, 2022, to determine which candidates would appear on the November 8 ballot.

Incumbents retiring

Democrats
District 39: Erica Thomas retired.
District 40: Erick Allen retired to run for lieutenant governor.
District 50: Angelika Kausche retired.
District 51: Josh McLaurin retired to run for state senator from District 14.
District 55: Marie Metze retired.
District 59: David Dreyer retired.
District 62: William Boddie retired to run for Commissioner of Labor.
District 64: Derrick Jackson retired to run for lieutenant governor.
District 79: Mike Wilensky retired.
District 80: Matthew Wilson retired to run for Insurance and Safety Fire Commissioner.
District 84: Renitta Shannon retired to run for lieutenant governor.
District 86: Zulma Lopez retired.
District 89: Bee Nguyen retired to run for Secretary of State.
District 95: Beth Moore retired to run for state senator from District 7.
District 105: Donna McLeod retired to run for U.S. representative in Georgia's 7th congressional district.
District 125: Sheila Clark Nelson retired.
District 135: Calvin Smyre resigned early.
District 153: CaMia Hopson Jackson retired.
District 154: Winfred Dukes retired to run for Commissioner of Agriculture.
District 163: Derek Mallow retired to run for state senator from District 2.

Republicans
District 3: Dewayne Hill retired.
District 21: Tommy Benton retired.
District 22: Wes Cantrell retired.
District 35: Ed Setzler retired to run for state senator from District 37.
District 45: Mitchell Kaye retired.
District 67: Micah Gravley retired.
District 69: Randy Nix retired.
District 71: Philip Singleton retired.
District 103: Timothy Barr retired to run for U.S. representative in Georgia's 10th congressional district.
District 112: Dave Belton retired.
District 114: Tom Kirby retired.
District 116: Terry England retired.
District 129: Susan Holmes retired.
District 145: Rick Williams retired to run for state senator from District 25.
District 147: Heath Clark retired.
District 160: Jan Tankersley retired.
District 169: Dominic LaRiccia retired.
District 179: Don Hogan retired.

Incumbents defeated in primary

Democrats
District 106: Rebecca Mitchell lost a redistricting race to fellow incumbent Shelly Hutchinson.

Republicans
District 24: Sheri Gilligan lost to challenger Carter Barrett in Primary Runoff
District 100: Bonnie Rich lost a redistricting race to fellow incumbent David Clark.
District 149: Robert Pruitt lost a redistricting race to fellow incumbent Danny Mathis.

Predictions

Results

Closest races 
Seats where the margin of victory was under 10%:

Sources:

District 1

District 2

District 3

District 4

District 5

District 6

District 7

District 8

District 9

District 10

District 11

District 12

District 13

District 14

District 15

District 16

District 17

District 18

District 19

District 20

District 21

District 22

District 23

District 24

District 25

District 26

District 27

District 28

District 29

District 30

District 31

District 32

District 33

District 34

District 35

District 36

District 37

District 38

References

See also 

2022 Georgia (U.S. state) elections
Georgia House of Representatives elections
Georgia House